In mathematics, a -matrix is a complex square matrix with every principal minor  is positive. A closely related class is that of -matrices, which are the closure of the class of -matrices, with every principal minor  0.

Spectra of -matrices 
By a theorem of Kellogg, the eigenvalues of - and - matrices are bounded away from a wedge about the negative real axis as follows:

If  are the eigenvalues of an -dimensional -matrix, where , then

Remarks 
The class of nonsingular M-matrices is a subset of the class of -matrices. More precisely, all matrices that are both -matrices and Z-matrices are nonsingular -matrices. The class of sufficient matrices is another generalization of -matrices.

The linear complementarity problem  has a unique solution for every vector  if and only if  is a -matrix. This implies that if  is a -matrix, then  is a -matrix.

A related class of interest, particularly with reference to stability, is that of -matrices, sometimes also referred to as -matrices. A matrix  is a -matrix if and only if  is a -matrix (similarly for -matrices). Since , the eigenvalues of these matrices are bounded away from the positive real axis.

See also  
 Hurwitz matrix
 Linear complementarity problem
 M-matrix
 Q-matrix
 Z-matrix
Perron–Frobenius theorem

Notes

References

 
 David Gale and Hukukane Nikaido, The Jacobian matrix and global univalence of mappings, Math. Ann. 159:81-93 (1965) 
 Li Fang, On the Spectra of - and -Matrices, Linear Algebra and its Applications 119:1-25 (1989)
Math. 19:170-175 (1972)

Matrix theory
Matrices